Tung Ya-ling (born 18 October 1971) is a Taiwanese taekwondo practitioner. 

She won a gold medal in featherweight at the 1991 World Taekwondo Championships in Athens, by defeating Ayşegül Ergin in the final. She also participated at the 1989 and 1993 World Taekwondo Championships.

References

External links

1971 births
Living people
Taiwanese female taekwondo practitioners
World Taekwondo Championships medalists
20th-century Taiwanese women